Karla Andrea Navas Boyd (born 12 September 2004) is a Panamanian artistic gymnast.  She is the 2022 Pan American champion on vault.

Early life
Navas was born in Panama in 2004.  Her mother Veronica Boyd was also a gymnast and her grandfather Guillermo Boyd Mora represented Panama in weightlifting at the 1968 Olympic Games.

Gymnastics career

Junior

2018 
Navas made her international debut at the Pacific Rim Championships where she finished seventh in the all-around.  She next competed at the Junior Pan American Championships, where she helped Panama finish seventh as team; Navas finished fifteenth in the all-around.  In October Navas competed at the Junior South American Championships where she placed eleventh in the all-around.

2019
Navas was selected to compete at the inaugural Junior World Championships alongside Hillary Heron.  Together they finished twenty-third as a team.  Individually Navas finished 47th in the all-around.  Navas ended the season competing at the Junior South American Championships.  She placed sixth in the all-around and helped Panama place third as a team.  During event finals she placed first on uneven bars, fourth on vault, and fifth on balance beam.

Senior

2020–21
Navas became age-eligible for senior competition in 2020; however most competitions were canceled or postponed in 2020 due to the global COVID-19 pandemic.  Therefore Navas did not compete that year.  She returned to competition at the 2021 Pan American Championships where she helped Panama place fourth as a team and individually she placed seventh in the all-around.  During event finals she placed fourth on vault and sixth on balance beam.

2022 
Navas competed at the Bolivarian Games where she helped Panama finish third as a team.  Individually she finished ninth in the all-around.  She won silver on vault behind Yamilet Peña and bronze on balance beam.  She next competed at the Pan American Championships where she helped Panama finish tenth as a team during qualifications.  Individually she placed twenty-first in the all-around but won gold on vault.  Additionally she qualified to compete at the upcoming World Championships as an individual.  At the South American Games Navas helped Panama finish fifth as a team.  Individually she placed fifth in the all-around, fourth on the uneven bars and balance beam, and seventh on vault.

Competitive history

References

External links
 

2004 births
21st-century Panamanian women
Panamanian female artistic gymnasts
Competitors at the 2022 South American Games
Living people
Sportspeople from Panama City